Ganj Muradabad is a town and nagar panchayat in Safipur tehsil of Unnao district, Uttar Pradesh, India. It also serves as the headquarters of a community development block containing 86 rural villages. Handicrafts are a major industry here. As of 2011, Ganj Moradabad has a population of 10,957, in 1,723 households.

This place is famous for the shrine of one of the prominent saint of naqshbandiya golden Chain Gaus E Zaman Maulana Shah Fazl-e-Rahman Ganj Muradabadi, Maulvi Shah Abdul Kareem sb, Maulvi Abdul Haleem sb, Faizullah Shah Baba. This town is protected from all corners by these personalities.

One can visit Ganjmuradabad by bus as well as train. There are daily bus service from (Jhakar Katti) near Kanpur Station to Ganjmuradabad its 85 km from there. From Lucknow one has to go to Kaisar Bagh Bus stand there are only four bus service available in the morning till 1 pm ganjmuradabad is 90 km from there. One can also come from Hardoi as well as Unnao its hardly 55 km from there.  Agra Lucknow Expressway is 3 km. from here.

Demographics

 India census, Ganj Muradabad had a population of 9377. Males constitute 53% of the population and females 47%. Ganj Muradabad has an average literacy rate of 38%, lower than the national average of 59.5%: male literacy is 44%, and female literacy is 31%. In Ganj Muradabad, 18% of the population is under 6 years of age.

The 2011 census recorded Ganj Muradabad's population as 10,957 people, in 1,723 households. The population consisted of 5,766 males and 5,191 females, with a corresponding sex ratio of 900 females to every 1000 males. The sex ratio in the 0-6 age group was 951, which was higher than the district urban average of 903. Members of scheduled castes made up 7.82% of the town's population, while no members of scheduled tribes were recorded. The literacy rate of Ganj Muradabad was 53.5% (counting only people age 7 and up); literacy was higher among men and boys (59.5%) than among women and girls (46.8%). The female literacy rate of Ganj Moradabad was the lowest among towns in Unnao district. 

In terms of employment, Ganj Muradabad had the highest percentage of main workers (i.e. people employed for at least 6 months per year) among towns in Unnao district in 2011, with 30.6% falling into this category. Marginal workers (i.e. people employed for less than 6 months per year) made up 12.1%, and the remaining 57.3% were non-workers. Employment status varied significantly according to gender, with 53.2% of men being either main or marginal workers, compared to 30.9% of women.

Education 
S.K.M. Public School
Rajeev Education Institute
 Rajkiya Balika Inter College
 D.C.K.M. Inter College
 Genius Public Inter College
 Ashok Mahavidyalaya, Ganj Muradabad
 Abdul Gaffar Mahavidyalaya, Ganj Muradabad

Villages 
Ganj Muradabad CD block has the following 86 villages:

References

Cities and towns in Unnao district